Rockville station is an intermodal train station located in downtown Rockville, Maryland, United States. It is served by the Washington Metro Red Line, MARC Brunswick Line commuter trains, and Amtrak Capitol Limited intercity trains.

Rockville station opened in 1873 when the Baltimore and Ohio Railroad (B&O) built their Metropolitan Branch (now the CSX Metropolitan Subdivision). B&O intercity service served the station until 1971; the station continued to be served by commuter trains (which became the Brunswick Line in the 1980s). Amtrak service began in 1973 with the Blue Ridge, followed by the Shenandoah in 1976 and the Capitol Limited in 1981.

The station building, designed by Ephraim Francis Baldwin, was added to the National Register of Historic Places in 1974 as Rockville Railroad Station. It was moved slightly to the south in 1981 to make room for Metro construction. The modern Metro station opened on December 15, 1984.

History

The Baltimore and Ohio Railroad (B&O) opened its Metropolitan Branch on April 30, 1873, providing direct service to Washington, D.C. from the west. Rockville station opened on May 19, 1873; the convenient access to Washington D.C. caused the town's population to more than double by 1890. The station and the 1887-added fright house were designed by Ephraim Francis Baldwin, head architect of the B&O. Long distance trains did not stop at the station in the B&O era. The first stop on long distance trains out of Washington was Silver Spring station instead.

The station building is among the few original Metropolitan Branch stations to survive. It is a brick Victorian picturesque structure with some Eastlake detailing, particularly in the roofline and gable decoration. The station was listed on the National Register of Historic Places in 1974 as the Rockville Railroad Station.

When Amtrak took over intercity passenger service on May 1, 1971, it did not include any service on the B&O; Rockville was served only by three daily commuter round trips to Brunswick and Martinsburg. Amtrak introduced the West Virginian (later renamed the Potomac Turbo and Potomac Special) in September 1971; it did not stop at Rockville. The Blue Ridge replaced the Potomac Special on May 5, 1973. The Blue Ridge was timed to serve as a commuter train; eastbound-only stops at Rockville and Gaithersburg were added on July 1, 1973. The Shenandoah, which stopped at Rockville in both directions, was added on October 31, 1976. The Blue Ridge began stopping at Rockville and Gaithersburg in both directions on weekends in 1977. The Shenandoah was replaced by the Capitol Limited on October 1, 1981, at which time weekend service ended on the Blue Ridge

Construction of a modern station for Amtrak, state-subsidized B&O commuter trains, and the new Washington Metro system began in 1981. In 1986, the Blue Ridge was taken over by MARC as part of the Brunswick Line—the state-subsidized ex-B&O commuter service—leaving the Capitol Limited as the only Amtrak service to Rockville.

On January 26, 2010, two Metro employees were killed when they were hit by a piece of track equipment at the station. They were installing new train control equipment in the track bed on the outbound track of the Red Line, towards Shady Grove.

Fron September 11, 2021, to January 16, 2022, the Metro station was closed due to the Rockville Canopy Replacement Project. The station reopened on January 16, 2022.

Station layout

Rockville station is located on an embankment south of Park Road and east of Hungerford Drive and downtown Rockville, with the Amtrak/MARC platforms just east of the Metro platform. Metro uses a single island platform between the two tracks of the Red Line, while Amtrak and MARC use two low-level side platforms flanking the two tracks of the CSX Metropolitan Subdivision. A pedestrian underpass provides access to the platforms from parking lots, bus bays, and kiss and ride lots on the east and west sides of the station. A footbridge over Hungerford Drive connects the west side of the station to the Montgomery County office buildings.

References

External links

, including photo in 2003, at Maryland Historical Trust website

Amtrak stations in Maryland
Brunswick Line
Stations on the Red Line (Washington Metro)
Railway stations in Montgomery County, Maryland
Washington Metro stations in Maryland
MARC Train stations
Railway stations in the United States opened in 1873
Railway stations in the United States opened in 1984
Rockville, Maryland
1984 establishments in Maryland
Former Baltimore and Ohio Railroad stations